Wardell-Yerburgh may refer to

Oswald Wardell-Yerburgh (1858–1913), a Church of England clergyman
Hugh Wardell-Yerburgh (1938–1970), a British Olympic rower, grandson of Oswald
Janet Wardell-Yerburgh, a British Olympic fencer, wife of Hugh